Endothenia euryteles is a species of moth of the family Tortricidae found in the Democratic Republic of Congo. The larvae feed on Geophila species.

References

Moths described in 1936
Endotheniini
Endemic fauna of the Democratic Republic of the Congo